Devonshire is an alternative and formerly official name for Devon, a county in South West England.

Devonshire may also refer to:

Places

Settlements
Devonshire, Blackpool, a district of Blackpool, Lancashire, England
Devonshire, Dallas, a neighborhood of Dallas, Texas, US
Devonshire Parish, Bermuda

Streets
Devonshire Place, City of Westminster, London
Devonshire Street, City of Westminster, London
Devonshire Street, San Fernando Valley, Los Angeles

Structures
Devonshire Buildings, two apartment buildings in Barrow-in-Furness, Cumbria, UK
Devonshire House, Piccadilly, Mayfair, London, UK
Devonshire Mall, Windsor, Ontario, Canada
The Devonshire, a historic apartment building in Indianapolis, Indiana, US
State (MBTA station), previously Devonshire station, in Boston, Massachusetts, US

People

Nobility
Countess of Devonshire (disambiguation)
Duchess of Devonshire (disambiguation)
Duke of Devonshire
Earl of Devonshire

Surname
Alan Devonshire (born 1956), English footballer
Ben Devonshire (1972–2017), English weightlifter
Henriette Devonshire (1864–1949), French translator and travel writer
Jane Devonshire (born 1966), British chef
John Devonshire (1774–1839), English naval officer
Les Devonshire (1926–2012), English footballer

Ships
Devonshire (East Indiaman), ships of the name
Devonshire class cruiser (disambiguation), two classes of Royal Navy ships
HMS Devonshire, ships of the name

Other uses
Devonshire manuscript, a 16th-century book of verses
Devonshire Ministry (disambiguation)
Turkey Devonshire, or simply Devonshire, a type of sandwich

See also

Devon (disambiguation)